Teatr Wielki may refer to:

Teatr Wielki, Łódź
Teatr Wielki, Poznań
Teatr Wielki, Warsaw